The Suleiman Bridge was a bridge in Osijek, over the Drava River in Slavonia, eastern Croatia. The bridge had an important role during the Ottoman–Habsburg wars, until it was finally burnt down in 1686.

Construction
The traffic and strategic importance of Osijek was sustained during the Ottoman period, but Osijek was then internationally known because of the Suleiman the Magnificent Bridge.

The construction of the bridge which connected Osijek and Darda, began by Pargalı Ibrahim Pasha on August 16, 1526 following the orders of Suleiman the Magnificent. The bridge was designed by Mimar Sinan, a military engineer who later became the sultan's chief architect.

Usage

The bridge had an important role during the Ottoman–Habsburg wars. After Suleiman crossed the river Drava at Osijek during his fifth imperial campaign in 1532, instead of taking the usual route for Vienna, he turned westwards into Ferdinand's held Hungarian territory.

The bridge was rebuilt during the rule of Suleiman II.

Destruction
Seen as a great threat to Christian Europe, the bridge was attacked several times, being destroyed in 1664, when it was set on fire on the orders of the Croatian feudal lord Nicholas VII of Zrin. After being rebuilt, the bridge was finally burnt down by the Austrian army in 1686.

See also
Islam in Croatia
Ottoman Hungary
Gunja Mosque
Ottoman Monuments of Ilok

References

Ottoman bridges in Croatia
Bridges over the Drava
Buildings and structures in Osijek
1520s in Croatia
Buildings and structures demolished in the 17th century
Demolished bridges